Live at the Troubadour 1969 is a live album by Tim Buckley. The album was recorded at the Troubadour in Los Angeles, September 3 & 4, 1969.

Track listing
All songs composed by Tim Buckley.
"Strange Feelin'" – 5:40
"Venice Mating Call" – 3:27
"I Don't Need It to Rain" – 11:06
"I Had a Talk With My Woman" – 7:32
"Gypsy Woman" – 14:31
"Blue Melody" – 5:37
"Chase the Blues Away" – 6:19
"Driftin'" – 7:56
"Nobody Walkin'" – 16:05

Personnel
Tim Buckley – Acoustic 12 string Guitar, Vocals, Marimba
Lee Underwood – Electric Guitar, Electric piano
John Balkin – Bass
Carter Collins – Congas, Cymbals
Art Tripp – Drums, Marimba

References

Tim Buckley live albums
1994 live albums
Rhino Records live albums
Albums recorded at the Troubadour